Marion Catholic High School (sometimes referred to as Marion Catholic Junior/Senior Preparatory High School) was a private, Catholic high school in Marion, Ohio, United States that was established in 1879 by three sisters from the Sisters of Charity. It was part of the Roman Catholic Diocese of Columbus.

In March 2013, it was announced by Bishop Frederick F. Campbell that Marion Catholic would close following the 2012–13 school year due to declining enrollment and financial concerns.

The first class graduated in 1882 and the current building was opened in 1957.  The building was listed on the National Register of Historic Places in 2017. The Marion Catholic Fighting Irish participated in the Northwest Central Conference.

Ohio High School Athletic Association State Championships 

 Boys Track and Field – 1989

Notable alumni 
 Ed McCants, basketball player

References

External links 
 

High schools in Marion County, Ohio
Educational institutions established in 1879
1879 establishments in Ohio
Educational institutions disestablished in 2013
2013 disestablishments in Ohio
Defunct Catholic secondary schools in Ohio
Buildings and structures in Marion, Ohio
School buildings on the National Register of Historic Places in Ohio
National Register of Historic Places in Marion County, Ohio
Defunct schools in Ohio